Kyle Keith Jacobs (born 18 October 1986) is an English former professional footballer who played in the Football League for Mansfield Town.

References

1986 births
Living people
English footballers
Association football midfielders
English Football League players
Oldham Athletic A.F.C. players
Mansfield Town F.C. players
Macclesfield Town F.C. players
Bangor City F.C. players
Welshpool Town F.C. players
Cymru Premier players